The Consolidated XPB3Y was a proposed extra-long-range flying boat for patrol and bombardment missions, developed from the earlier PB2Y Coronado. The United States Navy ordered the construction of a prototype on April 2, 1942. On November 4 of the same year, however,  the aircraft was cancelled due to the higher priority accorded to other Consolidated projects.

Specifications (February 1942 proposal)

See also

References

External links
Aerofiles - Consolidated

PB3Y
Flying boats
Four-engined tractor aircraft
Cancelled military aircraft projects of the United States
High-wing aircraft
Four-engined piston aircraft